Schwarzach bei Nabburg is a municipality in the district of Schwandorf in Bavaria, Germany.

The municipal is divided in 15 smaller settlements.:

References

Schwandorf (district)